Stillwater was an American band, based in Warner Robins, Georgia, that played Southern rock and was active from 1973 to 1984. They released two albums on Capricorn Records, Stillwater (1977) (the self-titled debut contains "Mind Bender," which peaked at #46 on the Billboard Hot 100 in February 1978), and I Reserve the Right (1978), before the label folded in 1979. Drummer David Heck joined Stillwater in 1981; they released the album Runnin' Free in 1996.

Band members
Mike Causey - guitar
Ken Kelly – guitar
Bobby Golden – guitar, backing and lead vocals
Jimmy Hall – percussion, lead and backing vocals (not the Jimmy Hall who sang lead for Wet Willie, another band signed to Capricorn in the '70s)
David Heck – drums
Sebie Lacey – drums, backing and lead vocals
Al Scarborough – bass guitar, backing vocals
Bob Spearman – keyboards, backing vocals (died 2002)
Rob Roy Walker – guitar, backing vocals

Discography
Stillwater (1977)
I Reserve the Right (1978)
Runnin' Free (1998)

Singles
 "Mind Bender" (1977)
 "I Reserve the Right" (1978)
 "Women (Beautiful Women)"  (1979)

References

External links
 
 [ Allmusic Biography]
 [ Allmusic Charts]
 [ Allmusic Overview]
 Bobby Golden interview SweetHomeMusic.fr & Bands of Dixie (2003)

Rock music groups from Georgia (U.S. state)
American southern rock musical groups
Capricorn Records artists
Musical groups established in 1973
Musical groups disestablished in 1982
Musical groups reestablished in 1996
Musical groups disestablished in 1997
1973 establishments in Georgia (U.S. state)